Biman Bangladesh Airlines was established in January 1972 as the Bangladesh national flag carrier. Operations started on 4 February 1972, initially on a domestic basis and using DC-3 aircraft, with services radiating from Dhaka to Chittagong, Jessore and Sylhet. International operations started on 4 March the same year, covering the London–Dhaka route on a charter basis under a sub-contract agreement with British Caledonian. From 1 January 1973 the same route, serving Gatwick Airport, started being operated by Donaldson International Airways on Biman's behalf. With a stopover in Bahrain, services to London in Biman's own right started on 19 June 1973, initially with a leased Boeing 707. By , the domestic route network comprised Chittagong, Comilla, Cox's Bazar, Ishurdi, Jessore, Sylhet and Thakurgaon and international services to Bangkok, Calcutta, Dubai, Kathmandu, and London were also provided. Frankfurt was first served in 1986. Frankfurt was resumed in late .

The airline had signed a deal with Boeing for ten new aircraft along with options for ten more in 2008. After getting delivery of the new planes, Biman expanded its destinations gradually and increased in-flight amenities, especially onboard Internet and WiFi; mobile telephony; and live TV streams. Biman Bangladesh Airlines is certified as safe to fly in Europe by the European Aviation Safety Agency. In addition, Biman has also passed the IATA Operational Safety Audit and since then, the airline has resumed flights to some of its previous destinations in Asia and Europe. , the airline serves 16 cities and destinations in 12 different countries across Asia and Europe. Biman Bangladesh Airlines restarted its direct flights to Delhi in 2019 after a gap of six years. Shortly after, the airline also resumed its direct flights to Manchester which was last served until October 2012. 
On 27 July 2022, Biman added its newest route to Toronto Pearson International Airport.

List
Following is a list of destinations the carrier flies to according to its scheduled services, . Terminated destinations are also listed together with both primary and secondary hubs of the airline.

See also

 Transport in Bangladesh

Notes

References

External links 
 Biman Bangladesh Airlines Destinations

Biman Bangladesh Airlines
Lists of airline destinations
Bangladesh transport-related lists
Aviation in Bangladesh